Ryan Manitowich (born July 5, 1978) is a Canadian former professional ice hockey player. He won 2009 Allan Cup with the Bentley Generals and won the 2010 Allan Cup with the Fort St. John Flyers.

Manitowich attended Iona College in New Rochelle, New York, where he played four seasons (1999–2003) of NCAA Division I hockey with the Iona Gaels. Manitowich
went on to play three seasons of professional hockey with the Bossier-Shreveport Mudbugs of the Central Hockey League (CHL), concluding his CHL career with the 2005–06 season having played a total of 164 regular season games and another 39 playoff games, all with the Mudbugs.

Manitowich continued to play Canadian senior hockey, twice winning the Canadian national championship and the Allan Cup; first in 2009 with the Bentley Generals, and again in 2010 with the Fort St. John Flyers.

References

Awards and honours

External links

1978 births
Living people
Bossier-Shreveport Mudbugs players
Calgary Canucks players
Canadian ice hockey forwards
Iona Gaels men's ice hockey players
Ice hockey people from Calgary